Vexillum plicarium, common name : the Plaited Mitre,  is a species of small sea snail, marine gastropod mollusk in the family Costellariidae, the ribbed miters.

Description
The shell size varies between 30 mm and 66 mm. This shell is usually white with black or dark brown spiral bands, but the basic color may also be cream or orange. The interior is white. The shape is fusiform, with various nodulose spiral ribs.

Distribution
This species is distributed in the Andaman Sea and in the Pacific Ocean along Samoa and the Philippines.

References

 Turner H. 2001. Katalog der Familie Costellariidae Macdonald, 1860. Conchbooks. 1-100 page(s): 51
 Petit R.E. (2009) George Brettingham Sowerby, I, II & III: their conchological publications and molluscan taxa. Zootaxa 2189: 1–218

External links
  Cernohorsky, Walter Oliver. The Mitridae of Fiji; The veliger vol. 8 (1965)
 
 WoRMS
 Biosearch

plicarium
Gastropods described in 1758
Taxa named by Carl Linnaeus